"Devil Inside" is Hikaru Utada's second English single, released under the name Utada. It is the second single from Exodus, and the first physical single released in the United States. Though it gained little mainstream attention, "Devil Inside" did do well on dance radio and hit number 10 on the Billboard Hot Dance Airplay chart, making it Utada's most played track in the United States until it was surpassed by "Come Back to Me".

The single was released on September 14, 2004. No music video was produced.

"Devil Inside (Richard Vission Radio Edit)" was featured on the hit US television series Queer as Folk, appearing early in the first episode of season 5. It was not, however, featured on the soundtrack to the series.

Devil Inside (RJD2 Mix) was featured on Utada's first English compilation album. Utada the Best.

Track listing

Charts

Weekly charts

See also
 List of number-one dance singles of 2004 (U.S.)

References

2004 singles
Hikaru Utada songs
Songs written by Hikaru Utada
2004 songs